Anthony Francis Mestice (December 6, 1923 – April 30, 2011) served as a Catholic auxiliary bishop of the Archdiocese of New York and the titular bishop of Villa Nova.

Biography
Born in New York City, Mestice was ordained for the New York Archdiocese on June 4, 1949.

On March 5, 1973, Mestice was appointed bishop and was consecrated on April 27, 1973.

Bishop Mestice retired on October 30, 2001.

Notes

Clergy from New York City
20th-century American Roman Catholic titular bishops
1923 births
2011 deaths